Duets is an album by American singer Frank Sinatra, released in 1993. Recorded near the end of Sinatra's career, it consists of electronically assembled duets between Sinatra and younger singers from various genres. The album was a commercial success, debuting at No. 2 on the Billboard albums chart, reaching No. 5 in the UK, and selling over 3 million copies in the US. It is the only Sinatra album to date to achieve triple platinum certification.

The album received mixed reviews from critics, with complaints stemming from Sinatra's specified style of isolated performance wherein he was never joined by his duet partners in the studio, an artificial method of record production which lacked the elements of personal collaboration and spontaneity. The guest singers had been directed to sing along to his pre-recorded vocal parts, and to make their performances complement his.

The cover art displays a specially commissioned painting of Frank Sinatra by LeRoy Neiman. Its sequel, Duets II, was released the following year. Both albums were packaged together in a "90th Birthday Limited Collector's Edition" released in 2005; North American pressings add an unreleased duet recording of "My Way" with Willie Nelson, while international pressings have him singing with Luciano Pavarotti.

Production
Sinatra was approached in 1992 with the idea of making an album of duets. Phil Ramone, Sinatra's manager Eliot Weisman and the Capitol executive producer Don Rubin discussed the details at Sinatra's house in Palm Springs, California. Ramone felt that Sinatra's classic songs would be brought to new, younger listeners by way of the Duets project.

For duet partners, Sinatra suggested Ella Fitzgerald but she was not well enough to participate.  Other artists, younger than Sinatra, were put on the list of potential partners.  Sinatra specified that the duet partners must not be in the studio when he was singing his part.

The project was pushed forward by Charles Koppelman, the CEO of EMI Records Group North America. An orchestra was rehearsed at Capitol Studio A in Los Angeles, where Sinatra had recorded many times, the orchestra using classic Nelson Riddle arrangements. Sinatra showed up for the first two days of intended tracking sessions but begged off laying down any vocals, the first day because he did not like being isolated in a vocal booth as intended by recording engineer Al Schmitt. On the second day, Hank Cattaneo (Co-Producer), suggested to Ramone, Schmitt and Pat Williams, that they create a small elevated stage set-up for Sinatra to stand on, and to place Bill Miller and his piano adjacent to Frank within the open-air stage/booth to make the recording session feel more like a live performance. However, Sinatra said his voice was not in optimal condition. At this point, about $350,000 had been spent to put the project together.  Ramone and Capitol were worried the record would never be completed. Ramone spoke to Hank Cattaneo, his co-producer, about his concern.  It was suggested that since Cattaneo was Frank's production manager and close friend, that he stay near Frank to assist in the sequence of songs and detail to Frank when the takes were acceptable and a retake was not required. Cattaneo further suggested to Ramone and Schmitt that they record with the wireless microphones that Frank was accustomed to using in live performances. Nine songs were recorded in five hours, beginning with "Come Fly with Me".  Capitol Records A&R chief Don Rubin was in attendance at the recording session.

The various duet partners were invited to participate remotely, their recordings sent to Capitol by way of ISDN digital telephone lines connected by EDnet to the digital recording equipment. Bono and Aretha Franklin asked that Ramone fly out to appear in person at their local studios to strengthen the connection to Sinatra and the project. Bono recorded his part to "I've Got You Under My Skin" while standing on a couch in the STS Studios control room in Dublin, singing into a handheld microphone. After Franklin recorded her part to "What Now My Love" in Detroit, she recorded a personal message to Sinatra, thanking him for the opportunity. The duet of “My Way” with Luciano Pavarotti was not recorded in time to make the primary release of Sinatra's Duets.  It was placed on the Sinatra 80 album and then added to subsequent pressings of Duets as a bonus track addition.  Hank Cattaneo produced and recorded this segment in Pavarotti's summer villa in Pesaro, Italy.

Release

The album was advertised as "The Recording Event of The Decade".

Some observers were not satisfied with its recording process.

Track listing
Unless otherwise indicated, Information is based on Liner notes

Notes
Intros to "What Now My Love" and "Witchcraft" arranged by Patrick Williams. 
”What Now My Love" arranged by Don Costa in 1965 for Steve Lawrence’s album The Steve Lawrence Show
"I've Got a Crush on You" originally arranged by Nelson Riddle in 1960.
"Summer Wind" arranged by Nelson Riddle in 1966.
"Come Rain or Come Shine" arranged by Don Costa in 1961.
"(Theme from) New York, New York" arranged by Don Costa in 1979.
"They Can't Take That Away From Me" originally arranged by Neal Hefti in 1962.
”Guess I’ll Hang My Tears Out to Dry” arranged by Nelson Riddle in 1958.
”In the Wee Small Hours of the Morning” arranged by Nelson Riddle in 1955.
”I've Got The World on a String" arranged by Nelson Riddle in 1953.
”Witchcraft” arranged by Nelson Riddle in 1957.
”I've Got You Under My Skin" arranged by Nelson Riddle in 1956.
”All The Way” originally arranged by Nelson Riddle in 1956 for “The Joker is Wild” film soundtrack.
”One for My Baby (and One More for the Road)” arranged by Nelson Riddle in 1958.

Personnel
Musicians
Duet partners - vocals (1-12), saxophone (13)
Frank Sinatra - vocals (all tracks)
Ron Anthony - guitar (1-2, 4–13)
Chuck Berghofer - rhythm bass (1-2, 4–13)
Gregg Field - drums (1-2, 4–13)
Jeff Hamilton - drums (3)
Michael Melvoin - piano, additional keyboards (3)
Bill Miller - piano (all tracks)
Charles Pollard - keyboards, additional music performer (2-4, 6, 8)
Dave Stone - double bass (3)
Paul Viapiano - guitar (3)

Production
Andre Fischer - producer (7)
David Foster - producer (3)
Albert Hammond - producer (4)
Ted Jensen - mastering engineer
Charles Koppelman - executive producer
Jay Landers - producer (3)
Tommy LiPuma - producer (Anita Baker's vocals on 11)
Phil Ramone - producer (1-10, 12–13, music on 11, Frank Sinatra's vocals on 11)
Hank Cattaneo - co-producer 
Don Rubin - executive producer
Al Schmitt - recording engineer 
Eliot Weisman - executive producer 
Patrick Williams - musical director, conductor
John Wheeler - EDnet network engineer

Charts

Weekly charts

Year-end charts

Certifications and sales

Television special
On 25 November 1994, Sinatra recorded a television special which aired on CBS, titled Sinatra: Duets. This was intended to promote both the album Duets as well as its successor, Sinatra's last studio recording, Duets II.

References

External links
9.24.93 PR: Frank Sinatra "Duets" Album Set For Release

1993 albums
Capitol Records albums
Frank Sinatra albums
Vocal duet albums
Albums produced by Phil Ramone
Albums recorded at Capitol Studios